Arotes is a genus of parasitoid wasps belonging to the family Ichneumonidae.

The genus was first described by Gravenhorst in 1829.

The species of this genus are found in Europe and Northern America.

Species:
 Arotes albicinctus Gravenhorst, 1829

References

Ichneumonidae
Ichneumonidae genera